The MOBO Awards (Music of Black Origin, also known as the MOBOs) are an annual British music award presentation honouring achievements in "music of black origin", including hip hop, grime,  UK Drill, R&B, soul, reggae, jazz, gospel, and African music.

The MOBO Organisation was founded by Kanya King, and the first MOBO award was presented to Baby D, in the Best Dance Act category.  The inaugural awards were broadcast by Carlton Television from London's Connaught Rooms. Across its 22-year history, the MOBOs have been broadcast on Channel 4, BBC Television, ITV2 and on Channel 5 before returning to the BBC in 2020. In 2009, the ceremony was held for the first time in Glasgow. Prior to that, it had been held in London. In 2011, the ceremony returned for a second time to Scotland. The awards then moved to Leeds for the first time in 2015.

The show returned to Leeds in 2017 when it was last held before going on hiatus. In 2020 it was confirmed it would be returning that year, however for the first time ever it would be streamed on YouTube.

Ceremonies
The ceremony was first broadcast regionally on Carlton Television from 1996 to 1997, before airing nationwide on Channel 4 from 1998 until 2003. From 2004 to 2014, they were aired by the BBC; beginning in 2006, the show aired live on BBC Three, and highlights aired on BBC One.

In 2014, the BBC dropped the MOBO Awards, and the ceremony moved to ITV under a three-year deal, airing on ITV2 with same-night highlights on ITV.

In 2017, the ceremony moved to Channel 5 and BET.

In 2018, the MOBO Organisation announced that the ceremony would take a one-year hiatus in order to plan a "bigger, revamped show" in 2019. However, the show did not materialise, with organisers now planning to hold the ceremony in 2020 instead; Kanya King stated that there would be "positive changes" to the show, and that they would be "returning with even more determination and energy to support and boost our culture wherever we can."

Table summary

Performers
In the course of its history, the MOBO Awards show has witnessed performances from UK and international talent. Over the years, artists have included Janet Jackson, E-17, Destiny's Child, Dionne Warwick, Lisa Maffia, Justin Timberlake, Kanye West, Tina Turner, Rosie Gaines, Dizzee Rascal, Jay-Z, LL Cool J, Amy Winehouse, Stefflon Don, Coolio, Usher, John Legend, Jason Derulo, and Jessie J.

In 2000, Sade came out of retirement to perform at the Awards, her first performance in almost a decade.

History
Kanya King launched the MOBO awards in 1996, aiming to establish a platform for music that, according to King, encompasses urban, hip hop, R&B and reggae.

1996
Best Album: Goldie - Timeless
Best Single: Gabrielle - "Give Me a Little More Time"
Best Newcomer: Peace by Piece
Best Video: Tupac Shakur featuring Dr. Dre and Roger Troutman - "California Love"
Best Hip-Hop Act: Blak Twang
Best R&B Act: Mark Morrison
Best Reggae Act: Peter Hunnigale
Best Gospel Act: New Colours
Best Jazz Act: Courtney Pine
Best Dance Act: Baby D
Best Jungle Act: Goldie
Best DJ: Trevor Nelson
Best International Act: Fugees
Best International Single: Fugees - "Killing Me Softly"
Outstanding Contribution to Black Music: Jazzie B
Lifetime Achievement Award: Lionel Richie

1997
The 1997 award ceremony was held at London's New Connaught Rooms on 10 November. The gala included performances by Mary J. Blige and Eternal.

Best Dance Act: The Prodigy
Best R&B Act: Shola Ama
Best Hip Hop: Funky DL
Best International Hip Hop: Coolio
Best Reggae Act: Finley Quaye
Best Jungle Act: Roni Size and Reprazent
Best Single: Eternal
Best Video: Will Smith
Best International Act: Blackstreet
Best Album: Jamiroquai
Best Newcomer: Shola Ama
Best Unsigned Act: Fola Sade
Best International Reggae Act: Beenie Man
Best Producer: Sean Puffy Combs
Best Radio DJ: David Rodigan
Best Club DJ: Metalheadz
Best Jazz Act: Sunship
Best Gospel Act: Beehive
Best International Single: Rosie Gaines "Closer Than Close"
Outstanding Achievement: Mick Hucknall
Lifetime Achievement: Bootsy Collins

1998
The Malibu MOBO Awards show was held at The Royal Albert Hall and hosted by Mel B and Bill Bellamy. It was broadcast nationally by Channel 4. Performers and presenters included footballer Sol Campbell, girl band All Saints, DJ Trevor Nelson, boxers Lennox Lewis and Chris Eubank, Puff Daddy, Chaka Khan, Goldie, Another Level, and Martine McCutcheon.  Contribution to Black Music went to Carl McIntosh and B.B. King won the Lifetime Achievement Award.

 Best Dance Act: Stardust
 Best Reggae Act: Glamma Kid
 Best Drum and Bass: 4 Hero
 Best Hip Hop Act: Pheobe 1
 Best Unsigned Act: Alison Brown
 Best Newcomer: Lynden David Hall
 Best R&B Act: Beverley Knight
 Best International Reggae: Beenie Man
 Contribution to Music: Carl McIntosh
 Best Video: All Saints
 Best International Act: Puff Daddy and the Family
 Best International Single: Pras feat ODB / Mýa
 Best Single: Another Level
 Best Album: Adam F
 Outstanding Achievement: Sean Combs
 Lifetime Achievement: BB King

1999
The 1999 Malibu MOBO Awards award ceremony was held at The Royal Albert Hall, sponsored by Malibu and hosted by Mel B and Wyclef Jean. International Hip-Hop Act Award went to Jay-Z, Best Album was awarded to Beverley Knight, International Act to Lauryn Hill and Lifetime Achievement Award to Tina Turner.  Performers and presenters included Des'ree, Dru Hill, Method Man & Redman, Tim Westwood, Lionel Richie, Lulu, Victoria Beckham, Chris Eubank, Another Level, Ladysmith Black Mambazo, Destiny's Child, and girl band Eternal.

 Best International R&B Act: Destiny's Child
 Best Newcomer: Kele Le Roc
 Best International Act: Lauryn Hill
 Best Hip Hop Act: Roots Manuva
 Best International Hip Hop Act: Jay Z
 Best Dance Act: Shanks & Bigfoot
 Best Video: TLC - "No Scrubs"
 Best Album: Beverley Knight - Prodigal Sista
 Best DJ: Trevor Nelson
 Best Single: Kele Le Roc
 Best Unsigned Act: Amoyé
 Best International Single: Eminem - "My Name Is"
 Best Reggae Act: Mr Vegas
 Contribution to Music: Erskine Thompson
 Best R&B Act: Beverley Knight
 Lifetime Achievement Award: Tina Turner

2000
The MOBO Awards 2000 ceremony took place at Alexandra Palace, hosted by Trevor Nelson and Lisa Left Eye Lopes and sponsored by Mastercard. There show opened with a performance of Money by Jamelia featuring Beenie Man. Craig David performed an acoustic medley of Fill Me In, 7 Days and Nice & Slow by Usher, Sade exclusively performed By Your Side, Gabrielle performed Rise, MJ Cole performed Crazy Love featuring Elizabeth Troy, Donell Jones performed U Know What's Up featuring ceremony host, Lisa 'Left Eye' Lopes. The show closed with a performance of Who Let The Dogs Out by Baha Men.

In addition to their performances, Craig David, Jamelia, Beenie Man, MJ Cole and Gabrielle also won awards. With Craig David receiving three awards in total.

Award presenters included MOBO Award founder, Kanya King, Honeyz, Melanie Sykes amongst others.

Best Newcomer: Craig David
Best Video: Jamelia - Money
Best Hip Hop Act: Eminem
Best Reggae Act: Beenie Man
Best Gospel Act: Mary Mary
Best Jazz Act: Ronny Jordan
Best World Music Act: Carlos Santana
Best UK Garage Act: DJ Luck & MC Neat
Best Producer: MJ Cole
Best UK Radio DJ: Tim Westwood
Best UK Club: Steve Sutherland
MOBO Unsigned Award: Cherise
Outstanding Contribution to Music: Aswad
Outstanding Achievement: L.A. Reid
Best UK Single: "Fill Me In" by Craig David
Best UK Album: Rise by Gabrielle

2001

2002
 Best R&B Act: Ashanti

2003
In 2003, the MOBO awards show moved to The Royal Albert Hall and was hosted by Blu Cantrell and Lil' Kim, with performances from DMX, Lumidee, Wayne Wonder, George Benson, Lemar, Seal, Mis-Teeq and Redman, J'Nay John Adeleye, Big Brovaz, The Black Eyed Peas and Kool and the Gang. Among the winners of the night were: 50 Cent, Justin Timberlake, Big Brovaz and Lisa Maffia, who was the only UK female artist to win an award.

2004
The ninth awards ceremony took place on 30 September 2004 at The Royal Albert Hall and was broadcast by BBC Television. Janet Jackson received the icon award. So Solid Crew won the award in the UK garage Act category award beating Dizzee Rascal and The Streets. Controversy surrounded the removal of reggae artists Vybz Kartel and Elephant Man from the "Best Reggae Act" category at the 2004 awards due to their homophobia and incitement to murder.

2005
The 2005 awards show saw one of the biggest line-ups in MOBO award history, including John Legend, Ms Dynamite, Lemar, Kano, Damien Marley, Public Enemy and Lauryn Hill. The event was hosted by Gina Yashere and Akon at The Royal Albert Hall, with guest presenters Chris Eubank, Lisa Maffia, Josie Darby, Simon Webbe, Myleene Klass, Estelle, Tim Westwood, Kwame Kwei-Armah and Chuck D. Big winners on the night included Corrine Bailey-Rae, Lemar, The Black Eyed Peas, Rihanna, Sean Paul and Beyoncé.

2006
In 2006 the awards ceremony was hosted by Coolio and Gina Yashere at The Royal Albert Hall. For the first time the World Music and Jazz categories were suspended. Corinne Bailey Rae won the prize for Best UK Newcomer and Jai Amore won Best Unsigned Act. British rapper Akala won Best Hip Hop Act, beating stiff competition from American acts such as Kanye West, 50 Cent, and The Game.

2007
The 2007 awards ceremony was broadcast live on BBC Three from the O2 Arena in London and hosted by Shaggy and Jamelia. The jazz category returned. Shaggy opened the evening with a medley. T-Pain performed on stage with Yung Joc, Craig David and Kano collaborated on stage; Ne-Yo, Mutya Buena and Robin Thicke also performed. Amy Winehouse performed two songs and accepted the award for Best UK Female. N-Dubz won Best Newcomer. England cricketer Monty Panesar and England footballer Micah Richards were among a line up of guests presenting individual awards which also included Sinitta and Quentin Tarantino.

2008
Best Album: Leona Lewis, Spirit
Best Song: Estelle, "American Boy"
Best Uk Male:: Dizzee Rascal
Best Uk Female: Estelle
Best Uk Newcomer: Chipmunk
Best Video: Leona Lewis, "Bleeding Love"
Best Hip Hop Act: Lil Wayne
Best R&B/Soul Act: Chris Brown
Best Reggae Act: Mavado
Best Gospel Act: Jahaziel
Best Jazz Act: YolanDa Brown
Best African Act: 9ice
Best International Act: Chris Brown
Best Club DJ: Tim Westwood
Best Radio DJ: Tim Westwood
Be Mobo: Ricky McCalla
Lifetime Achievement: Mary Wilson

2009

The 2009 awards event took place on 30 September at the SEC Centre in Glasgow, the first time the MOBO awards show took place outside London. A tribute performance was dedicated to Michael Jackson, and the Young Soul Rebels performed their charity single "I Got Soul". Reggie Yates and Keri Hilson hosted the awards show, with Peter Andre presenting backstage.

2010
The awards ceremony took place on 20 October 2010 in Liverpool.

 Best Newcomer: Tinie Tempah 
 Best UK Hip-Hop/Grime Act: Professor Green 
 Best African Act: K'Naan 
 Best Video: Tinie Tempah ft. Labrinth – Frisky 
 Best Reggae Act: Gyptian 
 Best Jazz Act: Empirical 
 Best Gospel Act: Guvna B 
 Best UK R&B/Soul Act: Plan B 
 Best International Act: Eminem 
 Best UK Act: JLS 
 Best Song: N-Dubz ft Mr Hudson - Playing With Fire 
 Best Album: JLS 
 Lifetime Achievement: Billy Ocean

2011
The awards show returned to Glasgow's SEC Centre on 5 October 2011, hosted by Jason Derülo and Alesha Dixon. Jessie J won four awards, making her the biggest winner of the night. Boyz II Men received the award for Outstanding Contribution to Music. Other winners included Rihanna, Tinie Tempah, Adele and Alborosie. Amy Winehouse was given an award and a special tribute, following her death in July 2011.

 Best Gospel: Triple O 
 Best Jazz: Kairos Quartet 
 Best Reggae: Alborosie 
 Best African Act: Wizkid 
 Best Song: Jessie J 
 Best R&B/Soul: Adele 
 Best Album: Jessie J 
 Best Hip Hop/Grime: Tinie Tempah
 Best Video: Tinchy Stryder ft. Dappy 
 Best Newcomer: Jessie J 
 Best International: Rihanna

2012
The 17th Awards show took place on 3 November 2012 at the Liverpool Arena. Presented by Miquita Oliver and Adam Deacon - with backstage support from Rickie and Melvin - the night saw Trey Songz, Conor Maynard, Emeli Sandé, Misha B, JLS, Stooshe, Labrinth, Angel and Wiley perform.

Emeli Sandé won awards for Best Female, Best Album and Best R&B/Soul while Plan B took Best Male Act and Best Hip Hop/Grime. TLC were awarded Outstanding Contribution to Music, with Dionne Warwick receiving the MOBO Lifetime Achievement Award. The full list of winners where:

 Best Gospel: Rachel Kerr  
 Best Jazz: Zoe Rahman 
 Best Reggae: Sean Paul 
 Best African Act: D'Banj 
 Best Song: Labrinth ft. Tinie Tempah, "Earthquake"
 Best R&B/Soul: Emeli Sandé 
 Best Album: Emeli Sandé 
 Best Hip Hop/Grime: Plan B 
 Best Video: JLS 
 Best Female Act: Emeli Sandé 
 Best Male Act: Plan B 
 Best Newcomer: Rita Ora 
 Best International: Nicki Minaj

2013
The 18th Awards show took place on 19 October 2013 and was held at the OVO Hydro in Glasgow. It was hosted by Trevor Nelson and Sarah-Jane Crawford. Performances included Tinie Tempah, Iggy Azalea, Naughty Boy, Rudimental and Jahméne Douglas.

Winners
 Best Male Act: Wiley 
 Best Female Act: Laura Mvula 
 Best Song: Naughty Boy, "La La La" 
 Best Album: Rudimental, Home
 Best Newcomer: Krept and Konan, ft. "Dizzy" Daniel Moorehead 
 Best R&B/Soul: Laura Mvula 
 Best UK Hip Hop/Grime: Tinie Tempah 
 Best Video: Naughty Boy, "La La La" 
 Best Gospel: Lurine Cato 
 Best Jazz: Sons of Kemet 
 Best Reggae: Sean Paul 
 Best African Act: Fuse ODG 
 Best International: Kendrick Lamar

2014
The 19th Awards show took place on 22 October 2014 and was held at The SSE Arena in London. It was hosted by Mel B and Sarah-Jane Crawford. It was broadcast live on ITV2 for the first time.

Performances
Professor Green feat Tori Kelly - Lullaby
Jessie J feat Kid Ink - Bang Bang + Burnin' Up
Krept & Konan & The All Stars - Don't Waste My Time
Fekky & Meridan Dan - Still Sittin Here + German Whip
Candi Staton & Little Simz - You've Got The Love
Jeremih feat Krept & Konan - Don't Tell 'Em
Ella Eyre - Comeback
Nicole Scherzinger - On The Rocks
Gorgon City Feat. MNEK & Jess Glynne - Ready For Your Love + Right Here

Winners
 Best African Act: Fuse ODG 
 Best Album: Sam Smith, In the Lonely Hour
 Best Female Act: Jessie J 
 Best Gospel Act: Living Faith Connection Choir 
 Best Grime Act: Stormzy 
 Best Hip Hop Act: Krept and Konan 
 Best International Artist:  Beyoncé 
 Best Jazz Act: Zara McFarlane 
 Best Male Act: Sam Smith 
 Best Newcomer: Ella Eyre 
 Best R&B/Soul Act: Sam Smith 
 Best Reggae Act: Stylo G 
 Best Song: Sam Smith, "Stay with Me" 
 Best Video: Skepta ft. JME, "That's Not Me"

2015
The 20th Awards show took place on 4 November 2015 and was held at the First Direct Arena in Leeds. The show was broadcast live on ITV2 and hosted by Sarah-Jane Crawford.

Performances
Ella Eyre - "Even If"
Krept & Konan - "Do It for the Gang, Certified + Freak of the Week"
Lianne La Havas - "Unstoppable"
Naughty Boy - "Running Lose It All"
Rita Ora - "Body on Me + Poison"
Section Boyz - "Trapping Ain't Dead"
FKA twigs - "Figure 8 + In Time" 
Fuse ODG - "Million Pound Girl (Badder Than Bad)" + "Dangerous Love"
Shakka - "Say Nada"
CeeLo Green - "Music to My Soul, Crazy" + "Forget You"

Winners
Best Hip Hop Act: Krept and Konan
Best Gospel Act: Faith Child
Best Grime Act: Stormzy
Best African Act: Fuse ODG
Best Newcomer: Section Boyz
Best Male Act: Stormzy
Best Song: Skepta, "Shutdown"
Best Female Act: Ella Eyre  
Paving the Way Award: Lenny Henry
Best R&B/Soul Act: Shakka
Best Jazz Act: Binker and Moses
Best Reggae Act: Popcaan
Best Video: FKA Twigs - "Pendulum"
Best Album: Krept and Konan, The Long Way Home
Best International Album: Drake, If You're Reading This It's Too Late
Outstanding Achievement: CeeLo Green

2016
The 21st Awards show took place on 4 November 2016 and was held at the OVO Hydro in Glasgow. The show was broadcast live on ITV2 and hosted by Rickie Haywood Williams and Melvin Odoom.

Tinie Tempah was due to perform, but pulled out hours before the show. He was replaced by Professor Green.

An error saw the wrong act given the award for Best Song. "Of the many worthy winners of best song, we deeply regret a mistake was made," said Mobo organisers, in a statement blaming a "production error".

Performances
Laura Mvula - "Ready Or Not (Here I Come)"
Lady Leshurr - "Queen's Speech" + "Where Are You Now?"
Craig David - "Rewind + Fill Me In + 16 + When The Bassline Drops + Nothing Like This"
Chase & Status ft Tom Grennan & Frisco - "All Goes Wrong + Funny"
WSTRN - In2
Clean Bandit ft Anne-Marie - "Rockabye"
Izzy Bizu - "Mad Behaviour"
Professor Green - "One Eye On The Door"
Popcaan ft Sneakbo - "Only Man She Wants + Too Cool"
Fekky ft Section Boyz - "Madting, Sadting"

Winners
Best Male Act – Craig David
Best Female Act – Lady Leshurr
Best Newcomer – WSTRN
Best Album – Kano: Made In The Manor
Best Hip Hop Act – Section Boyz
Best Song – Abra Cadabra ft. Krept & Konan - "Robbery (remix)"
Best Video – Nadia Rose - SKWOD
Best R&B/Soul – Shakka
Best Grime Act (In Association with BBC Radio 1Xtra) - Chip
Best International Act - Drake
Best Jazz Act - Esperanza Spalding
Best Gospel Act - Guvna B
Best Reggae Act - Popcaan
Best African Act - Wizkid
Paving The Way - Nicola Adams MBE and Ms. Dynamite

2017
The MOBO Awards 2017 took place at Leeds First Direct Arena on 29 November. Stormzy won three awards while Stefflon Don's award made her the only female winner on the night.
 Best Male Act - Stormzy
 Best Female Act - Stefflon Don
 Best Album: Stormzy – Gang Signs & Prayer
 Best Newcomer - Dave
 Best Song: J Hus – "Did You See"
 Best Video: Mist – Hot Property
 Best Hip-hop Act - Giggs
 Best Grime Act - Stormzy
 Best R&B/soul Act - Craig David
 Best International Act - Wizkid
 Best African Act - Davido
 Best Reggae Act - Damian Marley
 Best Jazz Act - Moses Boyd
 Best Gospel Act - Volney Morgan & New-Ye
 Paving The Way - Idris Elba

2021

2022

MOBO UnSung Awards
MOBO UnSung is a biennial talent competition for unsigned acts, showcasing the next generation of urban artists. The 10 finalists (unusually increased to 11 in 2018 due to the high numbers of entrants), are narrowed down to a top 3, which the winner is then picked from.

2022
 Finalists – A30, Adreyn Cash, Crae Wolf, Genesis Elijah, JClarke, Jordan Adetunji, Mace The Great, Natalie Lindi, Sarah Ikumu, and Zitah.

 Top 3 – TBC.

2018
 Finalists – Estée Blu, Fred Fredas, Fonzie, Graft, Harris Hameed, Ike Chuks, Jordz The Jay, Kris Evans, Marika, Sakyi 4, and Suelily.

 Top 3 – Fred Fredas, Graft, and Ike Chuks.

 Winner – Graft.

2016
 Finalists – Alika, Mullally, Mega Keggwa, Reekz MB, Juls, Tion Wayne, Liz Lubega, WildBoyAce, Jay Alexzander, and U.G.

 Top 3 – Alika, Mega Keggwa, and Mullally.

 Winner – Alika.

2014
 Finalists – Basheba, Blizzard, Eyez, Geovarn, Hayley May, J The Exodus, Mic Lowry, One 50, Tiana Major9 and YJ.

 Top 3 – Tiana Major9, Mic Lowry, and YJ.

 Winner – Mic Lowry.

2013
 Winner – In'Sight.

2012
 Winner – Esco Williams.

Criticism
The MOBOs have faced criticism for having become increasingly oriented towards "commercial" urban music, and having given nominations and awards to musicians who are not black. In 2003, a boycott effort emerged after the American pop musicians Justin Timberlake and Christina Aguilera won the awards for Best R&B Act and Best Video respectively. The Independent described the wins as being the result of the "white appropriation of black music". A MOBO spokesperson defended their presence, stating that the awards were designed to honour achievements in music of black origin, regardless of the ethnicity of their performers, and cited the increasing worldwide growth of urban music at the time.

In 2006, DJ and music journalist Bigger wrote that the presentation had been "veering away from its concept of rewarding music of black origin" as early as its third edition, noting its increasing dominance by American acts at the expense of domestic acts. He argued that the show had become "little more than a pat on the back and a jolly boys' outing for major labels and American acts."

In 2011, Lanre Bakare wrote in The Guardian that the show was being affected by the music industry's dilution of the distinctive black music scene,  promoting it to mainstream audiences as popular music (including "manufactured", U.S.-style hip-hop and R&B). In the column, it was noted that Labrinth had criticized the nominations of Conor Maynard and Ed Sheeran for awards, while Charlie Dark of Attica Blues argued that the MOBOs needed to promote innovation in black music, and "shouldn't be an annual event where everyone pats themselves on the back for very small advances that they've made, when they are powerful enough to bring real change. If they don't adapt, artists who aren't interested in commercial pop and being put in musical boxes will just do their own thing."

In 2020, English rock duo Nova Twins wrote an open letter on Twitter addressed to the MOBOs concerning the lack of a Rock/Alternative category, despite the fact that many POC have contributed to the evolution of rock music, and still are to this day, and hoping "that a Rock/Alternative category will be added to the MOBO (Music Of Black Origin) Awards in 2021, recognising the POC contributors to the genre". The MOBOS later replied on Twitter that "the MOBO Awards Judging Panel have actually discussed this and ... will continue to review potential category expansions for future Award ceremonies."

See also
British Black music
UK Gospel

References

External links

Kanya King talks about setting up the MOBO awards. YouTube

1996 establishments in the United Kingdom
Annual events in the United Kingdom
Awards established in 1996
BBC Television shows
Black British music
British music awards
Channel 4 original programming
Channel 5 (British TV channel) original programming
ITV (TV network) original programming
Lifetime achievement awards